1978–1990 (sometimes The Go-Betweens 1978–1990) is a 1990 compilation album by Australian band The Go-Betweens. The album draws together music spanning the band's career from their beginnings in Brisbane to their 1989 breakup, including singles, B-sides, songs recorded for broadcast and previously unreleased material.

Reception
Melody Maker said, "I find myself holding a package containing some of the most shockingly accurate songs about life and love I've ever heard. The fact the Go-Betweens never became massive is a disgusting injustice - but here's an opportunity to discover their dazzling brilliance." Robert Christgau said, "Half best-of, half collectorama, this gets you coming and going: you had no idea the album highlights would mesh into perfect pop, and you had no idea the 45-rpm obscurities would coalesce into imperfect pop."

NME noted the album, "spans their age, from the curiously unhinged art-pop of two Brisbane beatniks with a Phil Ochs/Patti Smith/Lee Remick obsession, to the smooth, accomplished craft of their last album."

Track listing
(All songs by Grant McLennan and Robert Forster)
 "Karen" (1978) – 4:03 (Included on vinyl edition of album only)
Recorded May 1978, Brisbane. Originally released as a single
 "Hammer the Hammer" (1982) – 2:50
Recorded January 1982, Melbourne. Originally released as a single
 "Cattle and Cane" (1983) – 4:02
Recorded October 1982, Eastbourne. Originally released on Before Hollywood
 "Man O'Sand to Girl O'Sea" (1983) – 3:26
Recorded August 1983, Sussex. Originally released as a single
 "Bachelor Kisses" (1984) – 3:29
Recorded July 1984, London. Originally released on Spring Hill Fair
 "Draining the Pool For You" (1984) – 4:16
Recorded May 1984, France. Originally released on Spring Hill Fair
 "Spring Rain" (1986) – 3:06
Recorded November 1985, London. Originally released on Liberty Belle and the Black Diamond Express
 "The Clarke Sisters" (1987) – 3:17
Recorded January 1987, London. Originally released on Tallulah
 "Right Here" (1987) – 3:52
Recorded December 1986, London. Originally released on Tallulah
 "Bye Bye Pride" (1987) – 4:03
Recorded January 1987, London. Originally released on Tallulah
 "The House That Jack Kerouac Built" (1987) – 4:41
Recorded January 1987, London. Originally released on Tallulah
 "Streets of Your Town" (1988) – 3:34
Recorded May 1988, Sydney. Originally released on 16 Lovers Lane
 "Love is a Sign" (1988) – 4:13
Recorded May 1988, Sydney. Originally released on 16 Lovers Lane
 "8 Pictures" (1981) – 4:49
Recorded July 1981, Melbourne. Originally released on Send Me A Lullaby;– 4:49 (Included on vinyl edition of album only)
 "I Need Two Heads" (1980) – 2:33
Recorded April 1980, Scotland. Originally released as a single
 "When People Are Dead" (1987) – 4:29
Recorded January 1987, London. Originally released as a single B side
 "The Sound Of Rain" (1978) – 3:05 (Included on vinyl edition of album only)
Recorded November 1978, Brisbane. Previously unreleased.
 "People Say" (1979) – 2:40
Recorded May 1978, Brisbane. Originally released as a single
 "World Weary (1981) – 1:41
Recorded April 1981, Sydney. Originally released as a single B side
 "Rock and Roll Friend" (1988) – 3:34
Recorded August 1988, London. Originally released as a single B side
 "Dusty In Here" (1983) – 4:10
Recorded August 1983, Eastbourne. Originally released on Before Hollywood
 "A King In Mirrors" (1984) – 2:58 (Included on vinyl edition of album only)
Recorded December 1983, London, for David Jensen Show
 "Second-Hand Furniture" (1984) – 4:13
Recorded October 1984, London, for John Peel Show
 "This Girl, Black Girl" (1983) – 2:31
Recorded August 1983, Sussex. Originally released as a single B side
 "Don't Call Me Gone" (1987) – 2:17
Recorded January 1987, London. Originally released as a single B side
 "Mexican Postcard" (1987) – 2:12 (Included on vinyl edition of album only)
Recorded August 1988, London. Originally released as a single B side
 "You Won't Find It Again" (1988) – 3:21
Recorded January 1988, Sydney. Previously unreleased

References

The Go-Betweens compilation albums
Albums produced by Tony Cohen
1990 compilation albums
Beggars Banquet Records compilation albums